Adrian Mainella is a Canadian fashion journalist and television personality. Previously the cohost of CH's Diva on a Dime, he became the new host of CBC Television's Fashion File in 2007 after being named the winner of the Fashion File Host Hunt competition.

External links

 Adrian Mainella

Canadian male journalists
Canadian fashion journalists
Participants in Canadian reality television series
Year of birth missing (living people)
Living people
Place of birth missing (living people)